Qeshlaq-e Sari Quyi Mikail (also Romanized as Qeshlāq-e Sārī Qūyī Mīkā'īl) is a village in Qeshlaq-e Gharbi Rural District, Aslan Duz District, Parsabad County, Ardabil Province, Iran. At the 2006 census, its population was 13, in 5 families.

References 

Towns and villages in Parsabad County